My Life was the twenty-fourth studio album of Country music artist Ronnie Milsap. It was released in 2006, marking his return to RCA Nashville, after a departure in 1991 following Back to the Grindstone. Two singles were released from the album including "Local Girls" and "You Don't Know My Love", the latter did not chart but the former reached  54 on country charts, Milsap's first activity on the chart since the release of "Time, Love and Money" from his 2000 compilation album 40 #1 Hits.

The track "If It's Gonna Rain" was previously recorded by country music artist George Strait on his 2000 self-named album.

Content
My Life starts off with the track, "You Don't Know My Love", which Milsap released as his second single from the album. Described by about.com as "a little funky," the song is "upbeat" while describing "stable love." The third track "My Life", shares its name with the album, and is reflective, finding the performer "reminiscing about his life." Allmusic remarked that the song had "nostalgic undertones" and was perfect for an individual in their sixties. Milsap was 61 upon the album's release. The fourth track, "If It's Gonna Rain", was written by songwriter Dean Dillon among others. Dillon is best known for his collaborations with George Strait, who had recorded the song six years prior to Milsap. "Rain" is a ballad that centers around lost love, repeating the chorus, "If It's Gonna Rain, Let it pour'" throughout the song. The next track, "Time Keeps Slipping Away" is described as "catchy" by about.com. The song discusses the fast-paced life of 21st century America.

The seventh track, "A Day in the Life of America", is described by allmusic.com as a "chronicling of mundane everyday events that borders on the depressing." The song discusses such activities as waiting in traffic, drinking coffee, microwaving dinner, checking e-mail, watching television in a day, and then proceeding to repeat the cycle the following day, while commenting that it's "just a day, a day in the life of America". The ninth track, "Local Girls" was released as a single, charting at No. 54. The song describes a man's visit to a tropical location, and his discovery of a "local girl", whom he ultimately marries. A video was released with the track. It features Milsap performing the song in a party setting.

Reception
The record peaked at No. 46 on the country albums chart, Milsap's first appearance on the chart since Back to the Grindstone. Allmusic gave the album four stars, describing it as "bright and tuneful and relaxed as the best of [Milsap's] early-[1980s] crossover albums" remaining "true" to his "strengths as a country-pop hitmaker." The tracks "A Day in the Life of America" and "My Life" are cited as addressing "American life in the early 2000s." About.com gave the album five stars, commenting that Milsap's voice "has remained virtually unchanged since he hit the airwaves in the early [1970s]."

Track listing

Personnel
 Jamie Brantley – acoustic guitar, electric guitar, background vocals
 Thomas Cain – background vocals
 Melodie Crittenden – background vocals
 Stuart Duncan – baritone ukulele, fiddle
 Rodney Edmondson – drums
 Jason Eskridge – background vocals
 Warren Gowers – bass guitar, background vocals
 Adam Hampton – keyboards, Hammond organ, background vocals
 Rhonda Hampton – background vocals
 Greenwood Hart – congas, acoustic guitar, jews harp, piano
 Jypsi – background vocals on "You Don't Know My Love"
 Shane Keister – clavinet, keyboards, Hammond organ, piano, Wurlitzer
 Brent Mason – electric guitar, gut string guitar
 Ronnie Milsap – lead vocals
 Matt Rovey – background vocals
 John Wesley Ryles – background vocals
 D. Vincent Williams – background vocals
 Lonnie Wilson – drums
 Glenn Worf – bass guitar

Chart

Singles

References

2006 albums
Ronnie Milsap albums
RCA Records albums
Albums produced by Keith Stegall